Camp Champlain is an unincorporated area and community in city of North Bay, Nipissing District in Northeastern Ontario, Canada. The community is located on a long, unnamed peninsula that separates Four Mile Bay from the rest of Trout Lake.

It consists of a number of cottages lining the eastern bulb of the peninsula and is served by Peninsula Road, which goes from Camp Champlain to Ontario Highway 63 at Lounsbury.

References

Communities in Nipissing District